Alpine climbing is a branch of climbing in which the primary aim is very often to reach the summit of a mountain. In order to do this high rock faces or pinnacles requiring several lengths of climbing rope must be ascended. Often mobile, intermediate climbing protection has to be used in addition to the pitons usually in place on the climbing routes. 

Alpine tours may be free (pitons, belay devices, slings are only used for safety, not to climb), aid climbing (i.e. all aids are used to assist the climb), clean (all protection devices are placed during the climb and then removed again) or free solo (no protection). A big wall may refer to a route that cannot be climbed within a day or a route that is primarily a rock climb. In addition, ice climbing is often a component of an alpine climb.

As the climbers are on wholly or partly on their own, depending on the availability and extent of routes in Alpine climbs, careful route planning and selection, and knowledge of anchor techniques and the laying of mobile protection devices, abseil and rescue techniques are required. Although most Alpine climbing is free, it may be necessary to use aid climbing, at points where there is no free climbing option, in order to avoid losing time and endangering the rope team.

In the 1980s, Alpine sport climbing was developed as a form of Alpine climbing, thanks to increasingly sophisticated equipment with better performance, especially in the sport climbing field. In Alpine sport climbing the aim is to increasingly raise the bar even on multi-rope routes.  

The annual Piolet d'Or awards are given to the best alpine climbs in the preceding year.

Protection

Two-person rope team 

The lead climber enters the route and uses any existing hooks to hang the rope on the quickdraws attached to it and/or adds (additional) anchors during the ascent of the pitch using equipment such as spring-loaded camming devices or slings. At the end of each rope length, the lead climber builds a belay. This in turn can be done on existing anchors (hooks) as well as on mobile protection devices. Then the second climber, secured from above by the lead climber, climbs to the belay and removes the devices previously attached by the climber as intermediate protection. From this point, the second climber either climbs ahead ("rollover climbing") or takes over the belay of the lead climber again.

In rollover climbing, the rope team advances a little faster, since otherwise the roles of belayer and climber have to be swapped at the belay. However, this method requires both climbers to be able to cope with the difficulties of the route when in the lead.

Three-person team 
When climbing multi-rope routes with a three-person rope team, two half ropes are almost always used. The lead climber is tied into both half ropes and the two second climbers into one half rope each.

The lead climber climbs the rope length, secured by one of the two second climbers. At the end of the rope length, he builds a belay and belays both second climbers at the same time, who (usually vertically) climb up to the belay and there one of the two takes over the belaying of the lead climber.

Descent 
After reaching the end of the route or the summit, the rope team descends via (hiking) paths back to their starting point or abseils down the route. In some areas there are also so-called "abseiling pistes" where abseiling routes are set up away from the climbing route. This is particularly useful if abseiling down the route would endanger other climbers, for example due to an increased risk of falling rocks.

Equipment 

Some of the equipment used in alpine climbing differs from that used in sport climbing. So, to reduce the risk of a rope breaking, twin or half ropes are often used. In addition, a helmet is almost always worn in alpine terrain, unlike sport climbing, where this is often neglected. Mobile belay devices such as Friends, Camalots, nuts and slings are used to protect routes that are not or not sufficiently secured. Sometimes more pitons are hammered in during the ascent.
Portaledges or bivouac sacks are used for routes that require overnight accommodation on the rock face or mountain. Bivouac bags are often carried along if no overnight stay on the mountain is planned. These are used as shelters in the event of a storm or in case the tour lasts longer than planned.

Protection 
Many alpine routes are insufficiently equipped with pitons or have none at all. For this reason, additional (mobile) protection must be placed or attached during the ascent. These include camming devicess and slings as well as extra pitons which are added during the ascent.

In the case of historically significant routes in particular, there is controversy regarding the maintenance and subsequent attachment of additional hooks.

Dangers 

Due to the nature of alpine terrain, there are more dangers associated with alpine climbing than with sport climbing in a climbing garden.
Because of the greater exposure and the possibility of having a rope team in front of you, rockfalls are much more likely. Animals such as chamois and ibexes or temperature changes can also trigger rockfalls and avalanches.
Alpine climbers are more exposed to weather and sudden drops in temperature triggered, for example, by thunderstorms, due to the length of their activities
An additional complication is that rescue from large rock face (e.g. in the event of injuries or sudden weather changes) is usually more difficult than when climbing crags

See also 
 Mixed climbing
 Ice climbing
 Rock climbing
 Glossary of climbing terms

References

Sources 
 Information on Alpine climbing at www.kletter-bergsport.de
 Information on objective and subjective dangers in Alpine terrain

Types of climbing
Types of Mountaineering